Becchi is an Italian surname. Notable people with the surname include:

 Carlo Becchi (born 1939), Italian theoretical physicist
 Egle Becchi (1930–2022), Italian pedagogist, historian, and academic 

Italian-language surnames